The S2 8.0 A is an American trailerable sailboat that was designed by Arthur Edmunds and Leon Slikkers as a cruiser and first built in 1974. The designation indicates the approximate length overall in meters.

The S2 8.0 A was the first of three 8.0-designated designs that all use the same hull, but different decks. The 8.0 A was replaced by the S2 8.0 B in 1976, which has a longer cabin coach house. The 1975 S2 8.0 C model has a center cockpit. The 8.0 A was initially marketed as the "8.0 Sloop" and was later known as the 8.0 A to avoid confusion with the later models that replaced it in production.

Production
The design was built by S2 Yachts in Holland, Michigan, United States from 1974 until 1975, with 40 boats completed, but it is now out of production.

Design
The S2 8.0 A is a recreational keelboat, built predominantly of fiberglass. It has a masthead sloop rig, a raked stem, a plumb transom, an internally mounted spade-type rudder controlled by a tiller and a fixed shoal draft fin keel or optional deep draft fin keel. It displaces  and carries  of lead ballast.

The boat is fitted with a Universal Atomic 4 gasoline engine for docking and maneuvering. The fuel tank holds .

The design has sleeping accommodation for four people, with a double "V"-berth in the bow cabin and a straight settee in the main cabin on the port side that opens into a double berth. The main cabin also has a folding table that hinges down from a cabin bulkhead. The galley is located on the starboard side, just forward of the companionway ladder. The galley is "L"-shaped and is equipped with a two-burner stove, an ice box and a sink. The head is located just aft of the bow cabin on the port side.

Operational history
In a 1976 review in Boating magazine Dick Rath and John Schieffelin wrote, "In appearance, the S2 8.0 Meter takes a little getting used to—she is both sleek and stout looking. In order to achieve standing headroom below, Edmunds and S2 had to give her startlingly high freeboard, plus a prominent trunk cabin. But the wallsided effect is softened considerably through the use of a double cove stripe, and the height of the trunk cabin is disguised by its modern, curving, bubble shape that flows into the cockpit coamings. Her rig adds a touch of the racing sailboat to her—quite tall, with a small mainsail, large foretriangle, and black anodized spars, it shows an IOR influence. With her pleasingly curved sheer, aggressively raked bow, and chopped-off stern, the S2 8.0 Meter looks rather racy and contemporary for an out-and-out cruising boat."

See also
List of sailing boat types

References

Keelboats
1970s sailboat type designs
Sailing yachts
Trailer sailers
Sailboat type designs by Leon Slikkers
Sailboat type designs by Arthur Edmunds
Sailboat types built by S2 Yachts